Owhrode is a community in the Udu Local Government Area of Delta State, Nigeria.

Owhrode is an Urhobo community, which consist of three towns namely Ekruneje, Erhiephihor and Ovworhokpokpor its  people speak Udu language which is the dialect of the Udu people. They share borders with Orhuwhorun, Usiefrun, Egini, Edjophe and Otor Udu.

Each of the three villages that make up Owhrode has its elected rotational leader called community chairman 

A study centre for National Open University is located there at Ghavwan.

In late 2016 Owhrode and other Udu communities were engaged in a border dispute with Ughievwen communities in Udu and Ughelli South LGAs.

The militant group Niger Delta Greenland Justice Mandate claimed responsibility for an attack on a gas pipeline in the Owhrode area on August 19, 2016.

References

Populated places in Delta State